The Archdiocese of Katowice is the Latin Metropolitan archdiocese of an ecclesiastical province in Western Poland.

Special churches 
Its cathedral archiepiscopal see is Archikatedra Chrystusa Króla, dedicated to Christ the King, in the city of Katowice, Śląskie.

It has several Minor basilicas :
 Bazylika św. Ludwika Króla i Wniebowzięcia Najświętszej Marii Panny, also in Katowice
 Bazylika Narodzenia Najświętszej Maryi Panny (Sanktuarium Matki Bożej Uśmiechniętej), in Pszów
 Bazylika NMP i św. Bartłomieja Apostoła (Sanktuarium Matki Sprawiedliwości i Miłości Społecznej), in Piekary Śląskie
 Bazylika św. Antoniego Padewskiego, in Rybnik.

Province 
Its ecclesiastical province comprises the Metropolitan's own Archdiocese and these Suffragan bishoprics :
 Roman Catholic Diocese of Gliwice
 Roman Catholic Diocese of Opole

History 
On 7 November 1922, the Holy See disentangled the Roman Catholic parishes in the Polish Autonomous Silesian Voivodeship, territorially comprising the East of formerly Austrian Cieszyn Silesia (since 1918) and formerly German East Upper Silesia (since 1922) from the then Diocese of Breslau as a permanent Apostolic Administration of Upper Silesia on 17 December the same year.
 On 28 October 1925, Pope Pius XI elevated that apostolic administration and renamed it after its see to Diocese of Katowice, then as suffragan of the Metropolitan Archdiocese of Kraków, by the papal Bull Vixdum Poloniae Unitas.
 In 1947, it lost territory to establish the Apostolic Administration of Český Těšín.
 It enjoyed Papal visits from the Polish Pope John Paul II in June 1983 and June 1999.
 It was promoted on March 25, 1992 as Metropolitan Archdiocese of Katowice.

Statistics 
As per 2014, it pastorally served 1,448,500 Catholics (97.4% of 1,487,500 total) on 2,400 km² in 319 parishes and 6 missions with 1,088 priests (963 diocesan, 125 religious), 1 deacon, 1,005 lay religious (189 brothers, 816 sisters) and 117 seminarians.

Episcopal ordinaries
(all Latin Rite)Apostolic Administrator of Upper Silesia August Hlond, Salesians (S.D.B.) (1922.11.07 – 1925.10.28 see below)Suffragan Bishops of Katowice 
 August Hlond (see above 1925.12.14 – 1926.06.24), also President of Episcopal Conference of Poland (1926 – 1948.10.22), later Metropolitan Archbishop of Gniezno–Poznan (Poland) (1926.06.24 – 1948.10.22), created Cardinal-Priest of Santa Maria della Pace (1927.12.22 – 1948.10.22), Founder of Society of Christ for Polish Immigrants (1932.09.08), Metropolitan Archbishop of Warszawa (Poland) (1946.06.13 – death 1948.10.22)
 Arkadiusz Lisiecki (1926.06.24 – death 1930.05.13)
 Stanisław Adamski (1930.09.02 – death 1967.11.12)
 Auxiliary Bishop: Teofilo Bromboszcz (1934.03.24 – death 1937.01.12), Titular Bishop of Candyba (1934.03.24 – 1937.01.12)
 Auxiliary Bishop: Juliusz Bieniek (1937.03.13 – death 1978.01.17), Titular Bishop of Dascylium (1937.03.13 – 1978.01.17)
 Auxiliary Bishop: Józef Kurpas (1962.11.23 – death 1992.05.19)Titular Bishop of Orisa (1962.11.23 – 1992.05.19)
 Herbert Bednorz (1967.11.12 – retired 1983), succeeding as former Coadjutor Bishop of Katowice (1950.05.04 – 1967.11.12) & Titular Bishop of Bulla regia (1950.05.04 – 1967.11.12)
 Auxiliary Bishop: Czesław Domin (1970.06.06 – 1992.02.01), Titular Bishop of Dagnum (1970.06.06 – 1992.02.01), later Bishop of Koszalin–Kołobrzeg (Poland) (1992.02.01 – death 1996.03.15)
 Auxiliary Bishop: Janusz Edmund Zimniak (1980.09.25 – 1992.03.25), Titular Bishop of Polignano (1980.09.25 – ...), next as Auxiliary Bishop of Bielsko–Żywiec (Poland) (1992.03.25 – retired 2010.01.16)
 Damian Zimoń (1985.06.03 – see promotion 1992.03.25 see below)
 Auxiliary Bishop: Gerard Bernacki (1988.03.18 – retired 2012.01.31), Titular Bishop of Sala Consilina (1988.03.18 – ...)Metropolitan Archbishops of Katowice 
 Damian Zimoń (see above'' 1992.03.25 – retired 2011.10.29)
 Auxiliary Bishop: Piotr Libera (1996.11.23 – 2007.05.02), Titular Bishop of Centuria (1996.11.23 – 2007.05.02), also Secretary General of Episcopal Conference of Poland (1998 – 2007); later Bishop of Płock (Poland) (2007.05.02 – ...)
 Auxiliary Bishop: Stefan Cichy (1998.08.26 – 2005.03.19), Titular Bishop of Bonusta (1998.08.26 – 2005.03.19), later Bishop of Legnica (Poland) (2005.03.19 – 2014.04.16)
 Auxiliary Bishop: Józef Piotr Kupny (2005.12.21 – 2013.05.18), Titular Bishop of Vanariona (2005.12.21 – 2013.05.18), later Metropolitan Archbishop of Wrocław (Breslau, Poland) (2013.05.18 – ...)
 Wiktor Skworc (2011.10.29 – ...), formerly Bishop of Tarnów (Poland) (1997.12.13 – 2011.10.29)
 Auxiliary Bishop: Marek Szkudło  (2014.12.13 – ...), Titular Bishop of Wigry (2014.12.13 – ...)
 Auxiliary Bishop: Adam Wodarczyk  (2014.12.13 – ...), Titular Bishop of Pomezania (2014.12.13 – ...).

See also 
 List of Catholic dioceses in Poland
 Roman Catholicism in Poland

Sources and external links 
 GCatholic.org, with incumbent biography links - data for all sections
 Catholic Hierarchy
  Diocese website

Roman Catholic dioceses in Poland
Religious organizations established in 1925
Organisations based in Katowice
Roman Catholic dioceses and prelatures established in the 20th century